Samodurovka is a rural locality (a village) in Vozdvizhensky Selsoviet, Alsheyevsky District, Bashkortostan, Russia. The population was 18 as of 2010. There is 1 street.

Geography 
Samodurovka is located 37 km southwest of Rayevsky (the district's administrative centre) by road. Aksyonovo is the nearest rural locality.

References 

Rural localities in Alsheyevsky District